The Ranger V-770 was an American air-cooled inverted V-12 aircraft engine developed by the Ranger Aircraft Engine Division of the Fairchild Engine & Aircraft Corporation in the early 1930s.

Design and development
In 1931, the V-770 design was built, derived from the Ranger 6-440 series of inverted inline air-cooled engines, and test flown in the Vought XSO2U-1 Scout. In 1938 it was tested in the Curtiss SO3C Seamew but was found to be unreliable with a tendency to overheat in low-speed flight, but would still be the most produced aircraft to have the V-770, with 795 being built. By 1941 a more developed V-770 was installed in the Fairchild XAT-14 Gunner prototype gunnery school aircraft, which went into limited production as the Fairchild AT-21 Gunner, of which 174 were built, not including one radial engine prototype.

Produced from 1941 to 1945, the V-770 featured a two-piece aluminum alloy crankcase, steel cylinder barrels with integral aluminum alloy fins and aluminum alloy heads. The V-770 was the only American inverted V-12 air-cooled engine to reach production. The engine was used in very few aircraft, among them the short lived Fairchild AT-21 twin-engine bomber trainer, and in the two Bell XP-77 light-weight fighter prototypes.

Variants

V-770-4 Installed in the Vought XSO2U-1 scout aircraft
V-770-6 Installed in the Fairchild XAT-14 Gunner prototype, intended for the Ryan SOR-1 Scout
V-770-7 Installed in the Bell XP-77 lightweight fighter prototype
V-770-8 Installed in the Curtiss SO3C Seamew Scout.
V-770-9 Installed in the North American XAT-6E Texan prototype.
V-770-11 Installed in the Fairchild AT-21 Gunner.
V-770-15 Installed in the Fairchild AT-21 Gunner.
V-770-17 Similar to V-770-8 but with raised hollow propeller shaft for mounting cannon or machine gun.
GV-770 Geared un-supercharged variants.
SV-770 Supercharged direct-drive variants.
SGV-770 Supercharged and geared variants.
SGV-770C-1B (V-770-11)
SGV-770C-2A (V-770-8)
SGV-770C-B1 Installed in the Ikarus 214 prototype
SGV-770D-4 (V-770-17) Similar to C-2A but with raised hollow propeller shaft for mounting cannon or machine gun.
SGV-770D-5 Developed for post-war commercial use,  at 3,600 RPM, weight , height , length , width

Applications
 Bell XP-77
 Curtiss SO3C Seamew
 Edo OSE
 Fairchild F-46
 Fairchild AT-21 Gunner
 Fairchild BQ-3
 Ikarus 213/Utva 213 Vihor
 Ikarus 214 (prototype)
 Vought XSO2U
 North American XAT-6E

Engines on display

 One restored engine in storage at the Carolinas Aviation Museum
 One survives at Cincinnati State Aviation school
 One modified V-770 survives in an art car by Michael Leeds
 The Yankee Air Museum has a V-770 on display.
 One restored engine at the Vintage Flying Museum in Fort Worth.

Specifications (SGV-770C-1)

See also

References

Aircraft air-cooled V piston engines
1930s aircraft piston engines
Inverted V12 aircraft engines